Lendmann (plural lendmenn) was a title in medieval Norway. Lendmann was the highest rank attainable in the hird of the Norwegian king, and a lendmann stood beneath only earls and kings. In the 13th century there were between 10 and 20 lendmenn at any one time.

The term  is first mentioned in skald-poetry from the reign of king Olaf Haraldsson (reigned 1015–1028) in the early 11th century. The lendmenn had military and police responsibilities for their districts. 
King Magnus VI Lagabøte (reigned 1263–1280) abolished the title lendmann, and the lendmenn were given the title of baron. In 1308 Haakon V of Norway (reigned 1299–1319) abolished the title baron as well. 

A lendmann was allowed to keep a retinue of forty without special permission from the king.

The term lendmann is sometimes confused with lensmann, which is a title used in local administration (a policeman in smaller towns) in later centuries, however the two terms are not related.

In English historical literature and translations, lendmann is often translated as landed man.

References

11th-century establishments in Norway
13th-century disestablishments in Norway
Medieval Norway
Early Germanic warfare
Norwegian nobility
Norwegian noble titles